Hålisstonga Peak is a peak,  high, marking the south end of the Kurze Mountains in Queen Maud Land, Antarctica. It was mapped and named by Norwegian cartographers from surveys and air photos by the Sixth Norwegian Antarctic Expedition (1956–60).

References

Mountains of Queen Maud Land
Princess Astrid Coast